The Mokhoabong Pass is a mountain pass in central Lesotho. The A3 road crosses this pass between the towns of Mantsonyane and Thaba-Tseka.

References
Fitzpatrick, M., Blond, B., Pitcher, G., Richmond, S., and Warren, M. (2004) South Africa, Lesotho and Swaziland. Footscray, VIC: Lonely Planet.

Mountain passes of Lesotho